The Cape Cod System was a computer system designed to simulate an air defense system covering southern New England. It was named after Cape Cod, the location of many of the radars.

History
The Cape Cod System was designed to demonstrate a computerized air defense system, covering southern New England. Signals from three long range (AN/FPS-3) radars, eleven gap-filler radars, and three height-finding radars were converted from analog to digital format and transmitted over telephone lines to the Whirlwind I computer in Cambridge, Massachusetts. The first tests of the Cape Cod System, beginning in September 1953, used only simulated data, but later tests used U.S. Air Force B-47 Stratojet bombers as stand-ins for Soviet bombers, and real interceptors scrambled from four Air Force bases.

The Cape Cod System verified that the new core-based machine was fast enough for use in SAGE, and an industrial effort was started in order to mass-produce the AN/FSQ-7 computers for this role. RCA was a front-runner, but IBM was eventually selected instead. They started production in 1957, along with a massive construction project to erect the buildings, power and communications network needed to feed the SAGE systems with data.

External links
The SAGE Air Defense System
Building information

North American Aerospace Defense Command
Cape Cod and the Islands